Alva Rogers (born 1959) is an American playwright, composer, actor, vocalist, and arts educator. She is known for the use of dolls and puppetry in interdisciplinary work. Rogers performed in the role of Eula Peazant in Julie Dash's 1991 film Daughters of the Dust. and was a vocalist in the New York City alternative rock band Band of Susans.

Early life 
Rogers was born and raised in New York City, where she graduated with a concentration in vocal music from The High School of Music & Art. She has a bachelor's degree in American history from Marietta College. In 1995, she received a Master of Fine Arts in musical theater writing from Tisch School of the Arts at New York University. In 1998, she received a Master of Fine Arts in literary arts from Brown University, and in 2013, she received a Master of Arts in teaching with a focus on history from Bard College.

Personal life 
Rogers lives and works in Manhattan.

Career

Art

Rodeo Caldonia 
Rogers has been a part of numerous notable artist collaborations. From 1985 to 1989, she was a founding member of Rodeo Caldonia, a black women's art collective formed in the Brooklyn neighborhood of Fort Greene that included fellow artists Lorna Simpson, Chakaia Booker and Sandye Wilson among others. With Lisa Jones, also a member of Rodeo Caldonia, she wrote a series of radio plays--Aunt Aida's Hand (1989), Stained (1991), and Ethnic Cleansing (1993)--for New American Radio on National Public Radio. In 2015 Greg Tate facilitated a panel discussion with Rogers and Lisa Jones about Rodeo Caldonia in the 2011 film Brooklyn Boheme.

Alva Rogers and her work with Rodeo Caldonia was included in the 2017 Brooklyn Museum exhibition We Wanted a Revolution: Black Radical Women, 1965–1985 curated by Rujeko Hockley and Catherine Morris.

During Robert Colescott's 1989 exhibition at the New Museum Rogers was featured in Black to the Future: Alva Rogers in Performance, a public program that unpacked the issues in Colescott's work. The program was curated by Kellie Jones.

Puppetry 
With puppeteer Heather Henson and the composer Bruce Monroe, she created three musicals:  nightbathing, mermaid, and Sunday (performed Off-Off-Broadway as part of the New Works Now! series at the Public Theater. Rogers also created audio recordings for Whitfield Lovell's work Whispers from the Walls.

Other work 
Rogers appeared on the cover of Essence Magazine's beauty issue in January 1993.  She has been photographed by photographer Lyle Ashton Harris and Dawoud Bey.

She was a writer in residence at Hedgebrook Women Playwright retreat on Whidbey Island, Washington in 2011 that culminated in a reading of her work at ACT Theater.

Acting

School Daze 
In 1988 Rogers played Doris Witherspoon in Spike Lee's film, School Daze about intra-racial prejudice in HBCU academia. It was an early film for most of the actors and most of the stars and crew were African American. The film co-starred Laurence Fishburne, Giancarlo Esposito, Tisha Campbell, Ossie Davis and Kadeem Hardison amongst others.

Daughters of the Dust 
In 1991 Rogers appeared in Julie Dash's film Daughters of the Dust. The film took place in 1902 about a matriarchal family during the Great Migration. Eula, Rogers' character, is raped by a white man and the fear of lynching gives her family no recourse to investigate her pregnancy. The film has been noted to have influenced Beyonce's 2016 album Lemonade. “Daughters was a major aesthetic leap forward for black cinema in that it did not mimic Hollywood storytelling but drew on European art house films, African traditions and created its own idiosyncratic style,” said Nelson George, filmmaker. The cinematographer for Daughters of the Dust was Arthur Jafa.

Other films 
Rogers appeared as herself in the film Brooklyn Boheme (2011), which documented the New Black Arts Movement in Fort Greene in the 1980s and 1990s. She is featured in Kerry James Marshall's film The Doppler Incident (1997) and was a frequent subject in the photographs of Lorna Simpson.

Filmography 
 1988: School Daze – as Doris Witherspoon
 1991: Daughters of the Dust – as Eula Peazant
 1994: Fresh Kill – as Cello player in locker
 2005: The Flooded Playground (Video short) – as The Singing Tree
 2010: Window on Your Present – as Girl On Shoulders
 2011: Spirits of Rebellion: Black Film at UCLA (Documentary) – as Eula Peazant
 2012: Brooklyn Boheme (Documentary) – as herself

Publications 
Rogers's works as a playwright include The Bride Who Became Frightened When She Saw Life Open, The Doll Plays, and Scooping the Darkness Empty.

Awards 
Rogers has won grants from the Jim Henson Foundation, National Endowment for the Arts, a New York Foundation for the Arts Fellowship in Playwriting in 2004, and the Rockefeller Foundation.

References

External links 

 
 

1959 births
Living people
African-American artists
Actresses from New York City
Artists from New York City
American women dramatists and playwrights
American puppeteers
21st-century African-American people
21st-century African-American women
20th-century African-American people
20th-century African-American women